Dracaena kaweesakii (Kaweesak's dragon tree; Thai: Chan nuu or Chan pha krai)  is a species of dragon tree. It can reach  in both height and crown diameter. It is only found growing atop the limestone mountains in the Loei and the Lop Buri Provinces of Thailand.

Description
Dracaena kaweesakii is a species of dragon tree characterized by an extensive branching system; a fully grown specimen has several hundred branches. It has cream-colored flowers that have and slight green or yellow tint and bright orange filaments. D. kaweesakii produces brown fruit that turn orange when ripe. The tree's trunk can reach  in diameter.

Dracaena kaweesakii in known from northern, northeastern, and central Thailand. Oral reports suggest it is also found in neighboring Burma. Higher altitude specimens tend to be shorter and less branching and smaller leaves. Because of its limited distribution and the harvesting of limestone for concrete production the species is thought to be endangered. As of 2013, the population was estimated to be less than 2500.

In May 2014, the International Institute for Species Exploration named D. kaweesakii as one of the "Top 10 New Species" named in 2013.

Taxonomic history
Dracaena kaweesakii was first described in 2013 by Paul Wilkin et al. in the journal PhytoKeys. The specific name derives from the name of Kaweesak Keeratikiat, a member of the team that identified the tree as a unique species.

Use by humans
Dracaena kaweesakii is commonly used in Thai horticulture due to its extensive branching.  A number of specimens are found on the grounds of Buddhist temples.  In general, species of Dracaena are thought to bring good luck to those who have the trees in their yards.

References

kaweesakii
Plants described in 2013